Scopula bullata  is a moth of the family Geometridae. It is found in the Baluchistan region of Iran.

The wings are greyish white, with a yellowish sheen with yellowish grey transverse stripes.

References

Moths described in 1986
Moths of the Middle East
bullata